Kaloudis Alexoudis (born ) is a retired Greek male volleyball player. He was a part of Greece men's national volleyball team. He played for Olympiacos for 5 years (1980–1985), winning 2 Greek Championships and 2 Greek Cups.

Clubs
  Evros Soufliou (1975–1979)
  Olympiacos (1980–1985)

References

1961 births
Living people
Greek men's volleyball players
Olympiacos S.C. players
People from Evros (regional unit)
Sportspeople from Eastern Macedonia and Thrace